Sunday at Devil Dirt is the second collaborative studio album by Isobel Campbell and Mark Lanegan, released May 13, 2008, through V2 Records. The album follows 2006's Ballad of the Broken Seas. Unlike the previous album, Lanegan flew over to Glasgow to record his vocal parts.

Track listing

Personnel
 Isobel Campbell – vocals, guitar, tubular bells, cello, vibraphone, piano, glockenspiel, tambourine
 Mark Lanegan – vocals
 Jim McCulloch – guitar
 Kirsty Johnson – accordion
 Ross Hamilton – double bass
 Duke McVinnie – bass
 Alyn Cosker – drums, loops
 Pam Smith – timpani
 Ross Hamilton – bass, double bass
 Bill Wells – bass
 Chris Geddes – organ
 Dave McGowan – piano, guitar
 David Paterson – guiro, percussion
 Dave McGowan – guitar, slide guitar, rhodes, organ, bass, steel guitar, piano
 Geoff Allen – percussion
 David Robertson – shaker, congas
 London Community Gospel Choir – backing vocals
 Greg Lawson – violin
 Dave Gormley – drums

References

2008 albums
Folk albums by American artists
Isobel Campbell albums
Mark Lanegan albums
V2 Records albums